Yoga For Indie Rockers is a fitness video that matches a traditional yoga workout with contemporary indie rock music and attitude.

The DVD features certified yoga instructor Chaos running a hardbody yoga workout with three students: Page Turner (advanced), Karri Langlois (beginner), and Kristina Sefeldt (intermediate). The DVD also features a Beginner's Session and three audio "channels" of musical soundscapes: indie, pop-punk, and electro.

The DVD was released on October 30, 2007 by HALO 8 Entertainment. Its sister release Pilates For Indie Rockers was released on November 13, 2007.

Track listing

Music Channel 1
 From The Bottom Of This Bottle - Crash Romeo (opening sequence)
 People Are So Fickle - Kevin Devine
 It Could Be Easy - House of Fools
 Space Invaders - Knifeyhead
 Apocalypse Blaze - The PoPo
 Going Nowhere - modwheelmood
 City Of Echoes - Pelican
 No Girl In My Plan - Two Lone Swordsmen
 Shooting The Breeze With An Air Rifle - The Stay Lows
 Unretrofied - The Dillinger Escape Plan
 Wisdom 05 - Enduser (closing meditation)

Music Channel 2
 Running Out Of Time - Roses Are Red
 Glass Figurines - DoubleheadeR
 We Declare War - Hello Nurse
 Heading West - Crash Romeo
 Ultra High - Paulson
 Kiss The Wake - Criteria
 New Man - Alec Empire
 Black Picket Fences - Novemberkills
 Stepping Stone - Jet Lag Gemini
 Sea Legs - Ladyfinger
 Once We Had A Word For This - Sorry About Dresden

Music Channel 3
 On A Bus In Brighton - Enduser
 Flexture - Edgey
 Pericardial Space - Stephen James Knight
 G.H.U. - Defragmentation
 Cavity - Edgey
 Lighter Days - Stephen James Knight
 Path Of Violence - Enduser

References

Yoga mass media